Michaelmas is a day in the Christian calendar.

Michaelmas may also refer to:
 Michaelmas (novel), a science fiction novel by Algis Budrys
 Michaelmas Island, an island in Western Australia
 Michaelmas term, the first term of the academic years of several United Kingdom universities

See also
 Michaelmas and Upolu Cays National Park, Queensland, Australia
 Michaelmas Daisy, plants in genus Aster
 Michaelmas Term (play), a Jacobean comedy by Thomas Middleton